Ngurah Rai Stadium is a multi-purpose stadium in Denpasar, Indonesia. It is currently used mostly for football matches. It is the home of the Perseden Denpasar football club. The stadium holds 12,000 people.

References 

Denpasar
Sport in Bali
Sports venues in Denpasar
Football venues in Indonesia
Football venues in Bali
Football venues in Denpasar
Buildings and structures in Denpasar
Buildings and structures in Bali